Church of Saint Peter and Paul in Tepljuh is Serbian Orthodox church in Croatia.

See also
 List of Serbian Orthodox churches in Croatia

References

Serbian Orthodox church buildings in Croatia
Buildings and structures in Šibenik-Knin County